Tim Henman was the defending champion but chose to participate in the 2004 Summer Olympics.

Lleyton Hewitt won in the final 6–3, 6–4 against Gilles Müller.

Seeds

Draw

Finals

Top half

Bottom half

External links
 Main draw
 Qualifying draw

Legg Mason Tennis Classic Singles